Bieno (Bién in local dialect) is a comune (municipality) in Trentino in the northern Italian region Trentino-Alto Adige/Südtirol, located about  east of Trento.

Bieno borders the following municipalities: Pieve Tesino, Scurelle, and Strigno.

Demographic evolution

References

Cities and towns in Trentino-Alto Adige/Südtirol